The Big 8 (previously the Big 7) are a group of newsgroup hierarchies established after the Great Renaming, a restructuring of Usenet that took place in 1987. These hierarchies are managed by the Big 8 Management Board. Groups are added through a process of nomination, discussion and voting.

History 

The original seven hierarchies were comp.*, misc.*, news.*, rec.*, sci.*, soc.*, and talk.*. They were open and free for anyone to participate in (except for the moderated newsgroups), though they were subject to a few general rules governing their naming and distribution.

alt.* was not part of the original seven but created separately as a place with more freedom and fewer rules than the Big 7.

In April 1995, when Usenet traffic grew significantly, humanities.* was introduced and it and the seven hierarchies created by the Renaming make up today's so-called "Big 8".

Hierarchies

The Big 8 Management Board 
The Big 8 Management Board was originally created in 2005 from former moderators of the news.announce.newgroups. The board's mission is to:

 creates well-named, well-used newsgroups in the Big-8 Usenet hierarchies;
 makes necessary adjustments to existing groups;
 removes groups that are not well-used; and
 assists and encourages the support of a canonical Big-8 newsgroup list by Usenet sites.

See also
alt.* hierarchy
Great Renaming

References

External links
The Big-8 Management Board

 
Computer-related introductions in 1987